Bibio rufithorax is a species of March fly in the family Bibionidae.

References

Further reading

External links

 

Bibionidae
Insects described in 1828